Reynoutria is a genus of flowering plants in the family Polygonaceae. The genus is native to eastern China, Eastern Asia and the Russian Far East, although species have been introduced to Europe and North America. Members of the genus, including R. japonica (Japanese knotweed) and its hybrid with R. sachalinensis, are highly invasive plants.

Description
Species placed in the genus Reynoutria are robust erect perennial plants, growing from rhizomes. They are usually monoecious, with mostly bisexual flowers, but also some unisexual flowers. The petals of the flowers are dry and paperlike when mature. The fruits are achenes with threefold sharp edges. The inflorescence is in the form of a panicle. The flowers have separated triangular stigmas with fringes (fimbriate) borne on long divided styles.

Taxonomy
The genus Reynoutria was erected by Maarten Houttuyn in 1777 for the species R. japonica. It was named in honour of Herr von Reynoutre who had been reported to have done a great deal of service to botany. As with many species in the family Polygonaceae, the taxonomic boundaries of Reynoutria have been much confused; in particular, it has been repeatedly merged with and separated from Fallopia. A series of molecular phylogenetic studies have clarified relationships; Reynoutria is a well-supported monophyletic taxon.

Reynoutria is placed in the tribe Polygoneae of the subfamily Polygonoideae. Within the tribe, it is most closely related to the genera Muehlenbeckia and Fallopia s.s., forming the so-called "RMF clade".

Species

, Plants of the World Online recognized the following species:
Reynoutria ciliinervis (Nakai) Moldenke
Reynoutria japonica Houtt. – Asian knotweed, Japanese knotweed
Reynoutria multiflora (Thunb.) Moldenke – Chinese knotweed
Reynoutria sachalinensis (F.Schmidt) Nakai – giant knotweed, Sakhalin knotweed
Reynoutria × bohemica Chrtek & Chrtková [R. japonica × R. sachalinensis] – Bohemian knotweed

Invasive potential
All members of the RMF clade appear to have the potential to become invasive, in some cases via vigorous hybrids. Reynoutria japonica is highly invasive throughout Europe and North America. The hybrid between R. japonica and R. sachalinensis, R. × bohemica, is also invasive, particularly in North America. R. japonica hybridizes with the New Zealand Muehlenbeckia australis. (The related M. complexa has established populations in southern parts of Britain and in the Channel Islands.)

References

Polygonoideae
Polygonaceae genera